The Vanuatu women's national cricket team represents the country of Vanuatu in international women's cricket. It is organised by the game's governing body in the country, the Vanuatu Cricket Association (VCA), which is an associate member of the International Cricket Council (ICC).

Having made its international debut the previous year, against Fiji, Vanuatu first participated in an international tournament at the 2012 ICC East Asia-Pacific regional qualifiers for the World Twenty20, winning two matches and placing fourth out of six teams. At the 2014 edition of the same tournament, they finished last, with only a single win (against the Cook Islands). Vanuatu's next major event was the women's tournament at the 2015 Pacific Games in Port Moresby, Papua New Guinea.

In April 2018, the ICC granted full Women's Twenty20 International (WT20I) status to all its members. Therefore, all Twenty20 matches played between Vanuatu women and another international side since 1 July 2018 have been a full WT20I.

History

"Traditional cricket", similar to the kilikiti played in Samoa, has long been popular amongst Ni-Vanuatu women, but the standard version of the sport was only popularised in the late 2000s, with the backing of the Vanuatu Cricket Association (VCA) and the ICC East Asia-Pacific development programme. Vanuatu made its international debut in April 2011, hosting a tri-series against Fiji and a team from the North Coast region of the Australian state of New South Wales. In May 2012, the country hosted the 2012 East Asia-Pacific Women's Championship. The tournament was played using the Twenty20 format, with the winner progressing to the 2013 World Twenty20 Qualifier in Ireland. Vanuatu joined the three teams from the previous 2010 tournament – Japan, Papua New Guinea, and Samoa – as well as the Cook Islands and Fiji. In the round-robin stage, Vanuatu recorded wins against Fiji and the Cook Islands, finishing fourth in the table. In the third-place playoff against Samoa, they lost by eight wickets.

At the 2014 EAP Women's Championship in Japan (a qualifier for the 2015 World Twenty20 Qualifier), Vanuatu again placed fourth in the group stages, though out of five rather than six teams (Fiji having dropped out). Their only win in the round-robin was by eight runs against the Cook Islands, but they were unable to repeat in the fifth-place playoff, losing by six wickets. In April 2015, the New Caledonian national women's team toured Vanuatu, playing six matches against Vanuatu in Port Vila. The tour was part of both sides' preparation for the women's tournament at the 2015 Pacific Games in Port Moresby, Papua New Guinea. Vanuatu also played against a mixed men and women's side from the Melbourne Cricket Club (MCC) in the lead-up to the games.

In December 2020, the ICC announced the qualification pathway for the 2023 ICC Women's T20 World Cup. Vanuatu were named in the 2021 ICC Women's T20 World Cup EAP Qualifier regional group, alongside seven other teams.

Tournament history

EAP Women's Championship
 2010: did not qualify
 2012: 4th place (6 teams)
 2014: 5th place (5 teams)

Pacific Games
 2015: 4th place (6 teams)

Records and Statistics 

International Match Summary — Vanuatu Women
 
Last updated 18 March 2023

Twenty20 International 

Highest team total: 172/6 v. Fiji on 3 October 2022 at Vanuatu Cricket Ground, Port Vila.
Highest individual innings: 53, Valenta Langiatu v. Samoa on 3 October 2022 at Vanuatu Cricket Ground, Port Vila.
Best innings bowling: 4/15, Nasimana Navaika v. Japan on 10 May 2019 at Independence Park, Port Vila.

Most T20I runs for Vanuatu Women

Most T20I wickets for Vanuatu Women

T20I record versus other nations

Records complete to WT20I #1388. Last updated 18 March 2023.

See also
 List of Vanuatu women Twenty20 International cricketers

References

Women's national cricket teams
Cricket, women

Vanuatu in international cricket
Women's sport in Vanuatu